Saint Demetrius (or Demetrios) of Thessalonica, also known as the Holy Great-Martyr Demetrius the Myroblyte (meaning 'the Myrrh-Gusher' or 'Myrrh-Streamer'; 3rd century – 306), was a Greek Christian martyr of the early 4th century AD.

During the Middle Ages, he came to be revered as one of the most important Orthodox military saints, often paired with Saint George of Lydda. His feast day is 26 October for Eastern Orthodox Christians, which falls on 8 November [NS] for those following the old calendar. In the Roman Catholic church he is most commonly called "Demetrius of Sermium" and his memorial falls on 8 October.

Life

The earliest written accounts of his life were compiled in the 9th century, although there are earlier images of him, and the 7th-century Miracles of Saint Demetrius collection. According to these early accounts, Demetrius was born to pious Christian parents in Thessaloniki, Macedonia in 270..

According to the hagiographies, Demetrius was a young man of senatorial family who became proconsul of the Thessalonica district. He was run through with spears in around 306 AD in Thessaloniki, during the Christian persecutions that occurred under the emperor Galerius, which matches his depiction in the 7th century mosaics.

Veneration of sainthood and celebrations

Most historical scholars follow the hypothesis put forward by Bollandist Hippolyte Delehaye (1859–1941), that his veneration was transferred from Sirmium when Thessaloniki replaced it as the main military base in the area in 441/442 AD. His very large church in Thessaloniki, the Hagios Demetrios, dates from the mid-5th century. Thessaloniki remained a centre of his veneration, and he is the patron saint of the city.

After the growth of his veneration as saint, the city of Thessaloniki suffered repeated attacks and sieges from the Slavic peoples who moved into the Balkans, and Demetrius was credited with many miraculous interventions to defend the city. Hence later traditions about Demetrius regard him as a soldier in the Roman army, and he came to be regarded as an important military martyr. Unsurprisingly, he was extremely popular in the Middle Ages. Disputes between Bohemond I of Antioch and Alexios I Komnenos appear to have resulted in Demetrius being appropriated as patron saint of crusading. 

Demetrius was also venerated as patron of agriculture, peasants and shepherds in the Greek countryside during the Middle Ages. According to historian Hans Kloft, he had inherited this role from the pagan goddess Demeter. After the demise of the Eleusinian Mysteries, Demeter's cult, in the 4th century, the Greek rural population had gradually transferred her rites and roles onto the Christian saint Demetrius.

Most scholars still believe that for four centuries after his death, Demetrius had no physical relics, and in their place an unusual empty shrine called the "ciborium" was built inside Hagios Demetrios. What were purported to be his remains subsequently appeared in Thessaloniki, but the local archbishop John, who compiled the first book of the Miracles ca. 610, was publicly dismissive of their authenticity. The relics were assumed to be genuine after they started emitting a liquid and strong-scented myrrh. This gave Demeterius the epithet Myroblyte.

In the Russian Orthodox Church, the Saturday before the Feast of Saint Demetrius is a memorial day commemorating the soldiers who fell in the Battle of Kulikovo (1380), under the leadership of Demetrius of the Don. This day is known as Demetrius Saturday. Demetrius was a patron saint of the Rurik dynasty from the late 11th century on. Izyaslav I of Kiev (whose Christian name was Dimitry) founded the first East Slavic monastery dedicated to this saint.

The Bulgarian Orthodox Church and the Romanian Orthodox Church revere Demetrius on 26 October ( [] in Bulgarian); meanwhile the Serbian Orthodox Church and Macedonian Orthodox Church (Ohrid) and the Coptic Church have a feast on 8 November (called  [] in Serbian and  [] in Macedonian).

The names Dimitar (Macedonian), Dimitry (Russian), Dimitar (Bulgarian), Dimitris (Δημήτρης, Greek), Mitri (short form of Dimitri in Lebanon) are in common use.

Iconography

The hagiographic cycles of the Great Martyr Demetrius of Thessaloniki include depictions of scenes from his life and his posthumous miracles. Demetrius was initially depicted in icons and mosaics as a young man in patterned robes with the distinctive tablion of the senatorial class across his chest. Miraculous military interventions were attributed to him during several attacks on Thessaloniki, and he gradually became thought of as a soldier: a Constantinopolitan ivory of the late 10th century shows him as an infantry soldier (Metropolitan Museum of Art). But an icon of the late 11th century in Saint Catherine's Monastery on Mount Sinai shows him as before, still a civilian. In Byzantine icons he is depicted in military dress, either standing or riding a horse. 
 
Another Sinai icon, of the Crusader period and painted by a French artist working in the Holy Land in the second half of the 12th century, shows what then became the most common depiction. Demetrius, bearded, rather older, and on a red horse, rides together with George, unbearded and on a white horse. Both are dressed as cavalrymen. Also, while George is often shown spearing a dragon, Demetrius is depicted spearing the gladiator Lyaeus, who according to story was responsible for killing many Christians. Lyaeus is commonly depicted below Demetrius and lying supine, having already been defeated; Lyaeus is traditionally drawn much smaller than Demetrius. In traditional hagiography, Demetrius did not directly kill Lyaeus, but rather through his prayers the gladiator was defeated by Demetrius' disciple, Nestor.

A modern Greek iconographic convention depicts Demetrius with the Great White Tower in the background. The anachronistic White Tower acts as a symbolic depiction of the city of Thessaloniki, despite having been built in the 16th century, centuries after his life, and the exact architecture of the older tower that stood at the same site in earlier times is unknown. Again, iconography often depicts saints holding a church or protecting a city.

According to hagiographic legend, as retold by Dimitry of Rostov in particular, Demetrius appeared in 1207 in the camp of tsar Kaloyan of Bulgaria, piercing the king with a lance and so killing him. 
He is shown on horseback piercing the king with his spear, paralleling the iconography (and often shown alongside) of Saint George and the Dragon.

See also
Demeter
Hagios Demetrios, the main sanctuary dedicated to Saint Demetrios
Saint Demetrius of Thessaloniki, patron saint archive

Notes

References

Sources

 Robin Cormack, Writing in Gold, Byzantine Society and its Icons, George Philip, London, 1985. 
 Eugenia Russell, St Demetrius of Thessalonica; Cult and Devotion in the Middle Ages, Peter Lang, Oxford, 2010. 
 James C. Skedros, Saint Demetrios of Thessaloniki: Civic Patron and Divine Protector 4th-7th Centuries CE, Trinity Press International, 1999. Summarized in Harvard Theological Review 89:410 (1996).   in JSTOR
 James C. Skedros, "Response to David Woods" Harvard Theological Review 93:3:235 (July 2000). at JSTOR
 Kurt Weitzmann in The Icon, 1982, Evans Brothers Ltd, London, ills. pp. 32,51,220 (trans of Le Icone, Montadori 1981), 
  free copy
 David Woods, bibliography on St. Demetrius

External links

 David Woods, St Demetrius from his Military Martyrs Web site. Includes article on Origins of the Cult, the Passion and Miracles by Anastasius the Librarian (BHL 2122 and 2123), images & links.
 The Life Of The Holy Great Martyr Of Christ Saint Demetrios The Myrrh-Bearer of Thessalonica Compiled by Fr. Demetrios Serfes 
 Holy, Glorious Demetrius the Myrrhgusher of Thessalonica Orthodox icon and synaxarion

3rd-century births
306 deaths
3rd-century Romans
4th-century Christian martyrs
4th-century Romans
Great Martyrs
Military saints
Myroblyte saints
Saints of Roman Thessalonica